The North Central Rockies forests is a temperate coniferous forest ecoregion of Canada and the United States. This region overlaps in large part with the North American inland temperate rainforest and gets more rain on average than the South Central Rockies forests and is notable for containing the only inland populations of many species from the Pacific coast.

Setting
This ecoregion is located in the Rocky Mountain regions of southeastern British Columbia, southwestern Alberta, northwestern Montana, northern Idaho, and northeastern Washington. The climate here is varied. Areas west of the Continental Divide experience greater precipitation and the moderating effects of the Pacific Ocean, while areas east of the Divide experience a drier, more continental climate. Valleys experience warm, wet summers and mildly cold, snowy winters, while subalpine zones experience cool, wet summers with the possibility of frosts, and very cold, snowy winters.

Flora
This ecoregion is predominantly coniferous forest. Lower elevation forests are dominated by Western hemlock (Tsuga heterophylla), Western red cedar (Thuja plicata) and Subalpine fir (Abies lasiocarpa), with medium-smaller and mixed populations of Lodgepole pine (Pinus contorta), Douglas-fir (Pseudotsuga menziesii), Western white pine (Pinus monticola) and Western larch (Larix occidentalis). Subalpine zones are dominated by Engelmann spruce (Picea engelmanni), Subalpine fir (Abies lasiocarpa), and, in areas affected by fire, Lodgepole pine (Pinus contorta). This ecoregion also contains meadows, foothill grasslands, riverside woodlands, and tree line/alpine zone communities.

Fauna
Mammals of the North Central Rockies forests include the gray wolf (Canis lupus), grizzly bear (Ursus arctos horriblus), wolverine (Gulo gulo), woodland caribou (Rangifer tarandus caribou), black bear (Ursus americanus cinnamomum), mountain goat (Oreamnos americanus), mule deer (Odocoileus hemonius), white-tailed deer (Odocoileus virginianus), Rocky Mountain elk ( Cervus canadensis nelson), moose (Alces alces), coyote (Canis latrans), cougar (Puma concolor), bobcat (Lynx rufus),  fisher (Martes pennanti), red fox (Vulpes vulpes), groundhog (Marmota monax) and American marten (Martes americana).

Conservation status and protected areas
Though large portions of this ecoregion are intact and protected, its conservation status is listed as "vulnerable". The main threats to this ecoregion's integrity are resource extraction and development, increasing human activity, logging, mining, livestock grazing and the introduction of exotic species.
Protected areas in this ecoregion include Glacier National Park in northwestern Montana, Yoho and Kootenay National Parks in southeastern British Columbia, Waterton Lakes National Park in far southwestern Alberta and the Selway-Bitterroot Wilderness in northeastern Idaho.

See also
 List of ecoregions in Canada (WWF)
 List of ecoregions in the United States (WWF)
 North American inland temperate rainforest

References

External links

Vanderbilt University.edu: North Central Rockies Forest ecoregion

Forests of the Rocky Mountains
Rockies, North Central
North Central
Ecozones and ecoregions of Alberta
Ecozones and ecoregions of British Columbia
Forests of Alberta
Forests of British Columbia
Forests of Idaho
Forests of Montana
Forests of Washington (state)
North Central
North Central
Rockies, North Central
Alberta's Rockies
Nearctic ecoregions